Bruce E. Levine is an American clinical psychologist, often at odds with the mainstream of his profession (see critical psychology), in private practice in Cincinnati, Ohio. He has been in practice for more than three decades. Levine writes and speaks widely on how society, culture, politics and psychology intersect (see Levine bio).

Levine's most recent book is Resisting Illegitimate Authority: A Thinking Person’s Guide to Being an Anti- Authoritarian—Strategies, Tools, and Models (AK Press, 2018). Levine describes how the capacity to comply with abusive authority is humanity's “fatal flaw,” but fortunately there are anti-authoritarians—people comfortable questioning the legitimacy of authority and resisting its illegitimate forms. However, as Resisting Illegitimate Authority reveals, these rebels are regularly scorned, shunned, financially punished, psychopathologized, criminalized, and even assassinated. Profiling a diverse group of US anti-authoritarians—from Thomas Paine to Harriet Tubman, Malcolm X, Lenny Bruce, and Noam Chomsky—in order to glean useful lessons from their lives, Resisting Illegitimate Authority provides political, spiritual, philosophical, and psychological tools to help those suffering violence and vilification in a society whose most ardent cheerleaders for “freedom” are often its most obedient and docile citizens. Discussing anti-authoritarian approaches to depression, relationships, and parenting, Levine makes it clear that far from being a disease, disobedience may be our last hope.

Levine notes that substance abuse is a risk for anti-authoritarians. He notes that treatment resistance can be a problem, but for many people treatment for substance abuse is of no avail. He states that anti-authoritarians must find a way to increase joy and decrease pain. He also argues that an indifference to money can damage anti-authoritarians. As examples of successful anti-authoritarians Levine cites Henry David Thoreau citing living within one's means, earning money, and maintaining relationship with friends flexibility as important.

He views violence as another risk to anti-authoritarians, citing rage and perceived impotence as a cause. He argues that violence can be convenient for authoritarians because it can be used to justify restrictions.

His previous book was Get Up, Stand Up: Uniting Populists, Energizing the Defeated, and Battling the Corporate Elite (Chelsea Green Publishing, 2011). It calls for a new kind of politics to help Americans overcome what Levine sees as political demoralization.

Published in 2007, Surviving America's Depression Epidemic: How to Find Morale, Energy, and Community in a World Gone Crazy (Chelsea Green Publishing) argues that by not seriously confronting posited societal sources of depression, American mental health institutions have become part of the problem rather than the solution. The book provides an alternate approach that encompasses what Levine describes as the whole of our humanity, society, and culture, and which redefines depression (as a problematic strategy to shut down pain) in a way that makes enduring transformation more likely.

Levine is also the author of Commonsense Rebellion: Taking Back Your Life from Drugs, Shrinks, Corporations and a World Gone Crazy (New York-London: Continuum, 2003), a protest book.  The 26 alphabetically ordered chapters of Commonsense Rebellion detail Levine's contention that the high national rates of mental illness in the United States are really just natural reactions (e.g., discontent and disconnectedness) to the oppression of what he terms an "institutional society," which he argues causes many to break down psychologically.  An earlier edition was released in 2001 with the subtitle Debunking Psychiatry, Confronting Society — An A to Z Guide to Rehumanizing Our Lives.

His article Troubled children and teens: Commonsense solutions without psychiatric drugs and manipulations (published in the book Alternatives Beyond Psychiatry (edited by Peter Stastny & Peter Lehmann – Berlin / Eugene / Shrewsbury: Peter Lehmann Publishing 2007,  [UK],  [USA], ebook in 2018) was also translated into the German language and published in the same year with the title Gestörte Kinder und Teenager. Sinnvolle Lösungen ohne Psychopharmaka und sonstige Manipulationen in Statt Psychiatrie 2 (edited by Peter Lehmann & Peter Stastny – Berlin / Eugene / Shrewsbury: Antipsychiatrieverlag, ebook in 2018).

Levine is a regular contributor to AlterNet, CounterPunch, Z Magazine, Truthout, and  The Huffington Post, and his articles have appeared in Adbusters, The Ecologist and many other publications.

Levine is a member of MindFreedom International, a group opposed to what they describe as coercive mental health treatment, and on the Advisory Council of the International Society for Ethical Psychology and Psychiatry (ISEPP).

See also
 Anti-psychiatry

External links

 Bruce E. Levine Web Site
 DepressionIsAChoice.com - 'A history of failure:  Author and psychologist Bruce Levine pummels psychiatry, psychotropic drugs and the role both may have played in the case of Andrea Yates', Amy Benfer (July 11, 2001)
 LiP Magazine - 'Mad, Mad Nation:  Mental Illness and the Drugging of Rebellious Tendencies', Silja J. A. Talvi (Interview of Bruce Levine, October 29, 2001)
 RadPsyNet.org - 'A review of Commonsense Rebellion''', Mel Starkman
 ZMag.org - 'Psychiatric Medications, Illicit Drugs, & Alcohol', Bruce Levine
 ZMag.org - 'Eli Lilly, Zyprexa, and the Bush Family: the Diseasing of our Malaise', Bruce Levine (May, 2004)
 Bruce E. Levine on Rag Radio Interviewed by Thorne Dreyer, June 3, 2011 (55:26)

References 
 

Year of birth missing (living people)
Living people
21st-century American psychologists
American male writers
Anti-psychiatry
Authoritarianism